Mark Knowles and Daniel Nestor were the defending champions but did not compete that year.

Mario Ančić and Andy Ram won in the final 2–6, 7–6(7–3), 7–5 against Diego Ayala and Robby Ginepri.

Seeds

  Justin Gimelstob /  Nenad Zimonjić (semifinals)
  Jordan Kerr /  Johan Landsberg (quarterfinals)
  Brandon Coupe /  Jim Thomas (semifinals)
  Jan-Michael Gambill /  Brian Vahaly (first round)

Draw

External links
 2003 RCA Championships Doubles Draw

Doubles
[